Mario Ruben (born 5 May 1968 in Rudolstadt, Germany) is a German chemist and university professor. Since 2013 he holds the research unit chair „Molecular Materials“ and is director at the Karlsruhe Institute of Technology and at the University of Strasbourg.

Life 

Mario Ruben studied chemistry from 1989 to 1994 at the Friedrich-Schiller-University Jena. In 1998, he obtained his PhD as fellow of the Studienstiftung des Deutschen Volkes with a work entitled Homo– and Heteronuclear Mg-Carbamato–Complexes for CO2–Activation at the Friedrich-Schiller-University Jena in the research group of Prof. Dr. Dirk Walther. Afterwards, he completed a two-years research stay as DAAD-fellow at the University of Strasbourg in the research group of Nobel laureate Jean-Marie Lehn, where he habilitated in 2005 with a work on Functional (Supra)Molecular Nanostructures.

In 2012 he received a call to join the Faculty of Physics at the University of Münster, Germany, which he declined to accept a W3 Full Professor position at the Faculty of Chemistry and Biology at the Karlsruhe Institute of Technology. He has published around 270 articles in refereed journals.

Research topics 

 CO2-activation and –transformation
 Implementation of quantum algorithms in molecules
 Molecular battery materials
 Switchable magnetic compounds

Publications (selection) 
 with C. Molina-Jiron, C. M. Reda, C. N. S Kumar, C. Kübel. L. Velasco, H. Hahn, E. Pineda-Moreno: Direct Conversion of CO2 to Multi-Layer Graphene using Copper-Palladium Alloys. In: ChemSusChem. Vol. 12, 2019, Nr. 15, p. 3509 – 3514.
 with W. Wernsdorfer: Synthetic Hilbert Space Engineering of Molecular Qudits: Isotopologue Chemistry. In: Advanced Materials. Vol. 31, 2019, p. 1806687.
 with Z. Chen, P. Gao, W. Wan, S. Klyatskaya, Z. Zhao-Karger, C. Kübel, O. Fuhr, M. Fichtner: A Lithium-Free Energy Storage Device based on an Alkyne-Substituted-Porphyrin Complex. In: ChemSusChem. Vol. 12, Nr. 16, 2019, p. 3737-3741.
 with B. Schäfer, J.-F. Greisch, I. Faus, T. Bodenstein, I. Šalitroš, O. Fuhr, K. Fink, V. Schünemann, M. M. Kappes: Divergent Coordination Chemistry: Parallel Synthesis of [2×2] Iron(II) Grid-Complex Tauto-Conformers. In: Angewandte Chemie Internationale Edition. Vol. 55, 2019, p. 10881–10885.
 with S. Thiele, F. Balestro, R. Ballou, S. Klyatskaya, W. Wernsdorfer: Electrically driven nuclear spin resonance in single–molecule magnets. In Science 344, 2014, p. 1135–1138.
 with R. Vincent, S. Klyatskaya, W. Wernsdorfer, F. Balestro: Electronic read–out of a single nuclear spin using a molecular spin–transistor. In Nature  488, 2012, p. 357–360.
 with S. Kuppusamy; D. Serrano; A.M. Nonat, B. Heinrich; L. Karmazin; L.J. Charbonnière; Ph. Goldner: Optical spin-state polarization in a binuclear europium complex towards molecule-based coherent light-spin interfaces. Nature Communs. Bd, 12, 2021, 2152, DOI:10.1038/s41467-021-223
 with D. Serrano; S. Kuppusamy; B. Heinrich; O. Fuhr; D. Hunger; Ph. Goldner: Ultra-narrow optical linewidths in rare-earth molecular crystals. Nature Bd. 603, 2022, 241–246, DOI:10.1038/s41586-021-04316

References

External links 
 Doctoral thesis of Mario Ruben in the catalogue of the German National Library.
 Mario Ruben at KIT and at the University of Strasbourg.
 

21st-century German chemists
1968 births
Living people
Academic staff of the University of Strasbourg
Academic staff of the Karlsruhe Institute of Technology